Ndiass is a village and rural community in the M'bour Department in the Thies Region of Senegal. According to PEPAM (Programme d'eau potable et d'assainissement du Millénaire), Ndiass has a population of 4794. Blaise Diagne International Airport, Senegal's primary airport, is located nearby.

The main settlements are Ndiass, Ndeing, Ngam, Sakirack, Khoubite, Sahé and Escale.

Ndiass is home to many baobab trees. The Popenguine Nature Reserve and Bandia Reserve are close and share the same ecosystem.

The main language is Saafi but also Wolof.

References
 Ndiass at  PEPAM
 Aéroport International Blaise Diagne à Ndiass

Populated places in Thiès Region